Mphande may refer to:

Juliet Mphande, a Zambian LGBT activist
Lyton Mphande,  a Malawian former lightweight and light-welterweight boxer